Megacerus is a genus of large-horned bruchines in the family Chrysomelidae. There are about 9 described species in Megacerus in North America.

North American Species
 Megacerus coryphae (Olivier, 1795)
 Megacerus cubiculus (Casey, 1884)
 Megacerus cubicus (Motschulsky, 1874)
 Megacerus discoidus (Say, 1824)
 Megacerus impiger (Horn, 1873)
 Megacerus leucospilus (Sharp, 1885)
 Megacerus maculiventris (Fahraeus, 1839)
 Megacerus ripiphorus (Fahraeus, 1839)
 Megacerus schaeffferianus Bridwell, 1929

References

Further reading

 

Bruchinae
Chrysomelidae genera